Chief business officer (CBO) is the position of the top operating executive of growing commercial companies or an academic/research institution (such as a university, college, institute, or teaching hospital).  In the commercial space, CBO shows leadership in deal making experience with a clear record of results and ultimate transactional responsibility. In higher education, the titles of vice president, associate dean, assistant dean, and director are also used for the role of the chief business officer

Commercial companies
In the biotechnology, information technology, and emerging innovation industries, the chief business officers assume full management responsibility for the company’s deal making, provides leadership and execute a deal strategy that will allow the company to fulfill its scientific/technology mission and build shareholder value, provides managerial guidance to the company’s product development staff as needed.  Reporting directly to a board of directors or the CEO of the company, a CBO sometimes has a dual role as a chief commercial officer and chief strategy officer. Often this position is created to complement a CEO whose strength and experience is concentrated mainly in product and technology.

A CBO is often given the responsibilities to conduct all business and corporate development activities, maintain relationship and project management of all partnership agreements, ensure marketing activities, including website related, activities, and more importantly, develop an exit strategy for the company to be acquired or go IPO.

Academics and research institutes
The titles of executive vice president and senior vice president are found most often in a university’s central administration office and a hierarchical relationship does not necessarily exist between those positions and the chief business officer position of a university affiliated institute or center which is often at an equivalent level. Several large public school districts in the United States now employ chief business officers to oversee the business operations of the school district as well as the work of individual school business managers. Independent schools increasingly use the chief business officer  title to identify the school finance director or school business manager. The chief business officer position in education should not be confused with the unrelated chief commercial officer or chief business development officer positions in other industries. Additionally, the chief business development officer title is often shortened to chief business officer in biotechnology, information technology, and startup companies.

A CBO is responsible for the administrative, financial, and operations management of the organization often combining the roles of chief administrative officer (CAO), chief financial officer (CFO), and chief operating officer (COO). As a result, the executive holding the CBO position, by definition, will usually possess a broader range of experience and more extensive skill set than individuals serving in those C-level positions.

As one of the highest ranking executives in an academic or research organization, the CBO may oversee strategic planning in addition to budgeting, financial management, contracts, human resources, procurement, compliance, real estate, facilities, information technology and risk management. At many colleges and universities sustainability and green building initiatives fall under the purview of the CBO while other institutions include community and local government relations in the CBO's responsibilities 
.

Qualifications
Many CBOs typically hold advanced academic degrees (MBA, PhD, etc.) or leading professional credentials and continue to participate in academic research or consulting projects in their areas of expertise. Job experience for the CBO  role is generally gained, on the job, at the department, unit or program level prior to advancing into a CBO role although business officers at all levels are sometimes hired from private industry, government or other non-profit organizations.

Educational requirements for the CBO position vary by different commercial companies and institutions 
.

See also
 Chief administrative officer
 Chief financial officer
 Chief operating officer
Chief strategy officer

References

Chief executive officers
Management occupations
Positions of authority
Corporate governance
B